Mammillaria sheldonii is a species of cactus in the subfamily Cactoideae.

Description
The plants branch out from the base and usually form small cushions. The slender, cylindrical shoots are dull green, often reddish and reach heights of growth of 8 to 20 centimeters with diameters of up to 6 centimeters. The cylindrical, keel-shaped warts on four sides at the base do not contain any milky sap. The axillae are bare and sometimes have some bristles. The 1 to 4 strong central spines are up to 15 millimeters long. The lower one is stretched and either straight or hooked. The 9 to 24 radial spines are white with dark tips and are 6 to 8 millimeters long.

The funnel-shaped, light purple-pink flowers are 2 inches long and in diameter. The edges of the petals are paler and almost white. The flower often opens for several days. The stamens consist of light purple stamens and orange-yellow anthers. The style is light pink to yellow. The light olive, 3 to 5 millimeter long stigma is 6 to 8 parts and protrudes over the stamens by about 4 millimeters.

The club-shaped, pale scarlet-red fruits have a slightly sloping flower remnant, are 25 to 30 millimeters long and contain black, spherical seeds.

References

External links

Plants described in 1933
sheldonii